This is a list of properties and districts in Lamar County, Georgia that are listed on the National Register of Historic Places (NRHP).

Current listings

|}

References

Lamar
Buildings and structures in Lamar County, Georgia